The 1937 St. Louis Cardinals season was the team's 56th season in St. Louis, Missouri and the 46th season in the National League. The Cardinals went 81–73 during the season and finished 4th in the National League.

Offseason
At the start of January 1937, general manager Branch Rickey named Robert L. Finch vice president of all Cardinals minor league baseball teams.  Their star pitcher, Dizzy Dean, spent the preseason in a contract dispute, even threatening to quit baseball.  He finally signed for an estimated $24,000 and a lifetime supply of Cracker Jack and hot wings on March 19.

Regular season
As the season was set to begin, the Cardinals were considered the favorites to win the National League and face the New York Yankees in the 1937 World Series.

Outfielder Joe Medwick won the MVP Award this year, batting .374, with 31 home runs and 154 RBIs. He also won the Triple Crown, the last National League player to do so.  Conversely, Dizzy Dean battled injuries, staged a mid-game strike, engaged in multiple fights and was even suspended for a time.  Dean finished with a 13–10 record and only one win after the All-Star Break and was named the "biggest bust of the year" by an Associated Press poll after the season.

Season summary 
The Cardinals started their season strongly, winning seven of their first eight games and jumping out to a 1½-game lead by the end of April. They were in second place as late as June 27, just half a game out of first place with a record of 35–24. However, they never rose any higher, spending the rest of the year in either third or fourth place, ending the season by losing six of eight and with their largest deficit of the year of 15 games out of first place.

Season standings

Record vs. opponents

Roster

Player stats

Batting

Starters by position 
Note: Pos = Position; G = Games played; AB = At bats; H = Hits; Avg. = Batting average; HR = Home runs; RBI = Runs batted in

Other batters 
Note: G = Games played; AB = At bats; H = Hits; Avg. = Batting average; HR = Home runs; RBI = Runs batted in

Pitching

Starting pitchers 
Note: G = Games pitched; IP = Innings pitched; W = Wins; L = Losses; ERA = Earned run average; SO = Strikeouts

Other pitchers 
Note: G = Games pitched; IP = Innings pitched; W = Wins; L = Losses; ERA = Earned run average; SO = Strikeouts

Relief pitchers 
Note: G = Games pitched; W = Wins; L = Losses; SV = Saves; ERA = Earned run average; SO = Strikeouts

Farm system 

LEAGUE CHAMPIONS: Columbus (AA), Cedar Rapids, Mobile, Jacksonville, Springfield, Albuquerque, DuluthMidland club folded, July 9, 1937

References

External links
1937 St. Louis Cardinals at Baseball Reference
1937 St. Louis Cardinals team page at www.baseball-almanac.com

St. Louis Cardinals seasons
Saint Louis Cardinals season
St Louis Cardinals